Joseph Viger (February 13, 1739 – November 17, 1803) was a businessman and political figure in Lower Canada.

He was born Joseph-René Viger in Montreal in 1739, the son of Jacques Viger, a shoemaker. He became a lumber merchant at Rivière-des-Prairies near Montreal and then at L'Assomption. He was elected to the Legislative Assembly of Lower Canada in Leinster County in 1796.

Viger died at Saint-Sulpice in 1803.

His brothers, Denis and Jacques, also served in the legislative assembly. His nephew, Jacques Viger, later became the first mayor of Montreal.

External links

1739 births
1803 deaths
Members of the Legislative Assembly of Lower Canada